Ignacio Bonadío (born 27 July 1993) is an Argentine footballer who plays for Tigre.

References

Argentine footballers
1993 births
Living people
Club Atlético Tigre footballers
Argentine Primera División players
Association football defenders
Footballers from Buenos Aires